The second season of Estrellas en el Hielo premiered on October 23, 2008; the first results show was an elimination episode airing on October 30, 2008. The show followed the format of previous seasons, with 9 couples.

Couples
The contestants were announced during the season finale of the first season of Estrellas en el Hielo by the hosts of the show, Rafael Araneda and Karen Doggenweiler. The contestants were:
{| align=center border="2" cellpadding="4" cellspacing="0" style="margin: 1em 1em 1em 0; background: #f9f9f9; border: 1px #aaa solid; border-collapse: collapse; font-size: 95%;"
|- bgcolor="#CCCCCC" align="center"

! Celebrity
! Occupation
! Professional partner
! Status
! Place
|-
| Ronny Munizaga
| 
| Roberta Davagnino
Eliminated 1st on October 30, 2008
|#9
|-
| Carla Ballero
| 
| Engeny Kerstia
Eliminated 2nd on November 6, 2008
|#8
|-
| Jorge Garcés
| 
| Olga Guseva
Eliminated 3rd on November 13, 2008
|#7
|-
| Fabián Estay                         
| 
| Ludmila Ksenofontova
Eliminated 4th on November 20, 2008
|#6
|-
| Patricia López
| 
| David Campos
Eliminated 5th on November 27, 2008
|#5
|-
| Andrea Molina
| 
| Artiom Sarkisyan
|
|
|-
| Daniela Castillo
| 
| Pablo Lashmanov
|
|
|-
| Fernanda Hansen
| 
| Alfonso Campa
|
|
|-
| Guido Vecchiola
| 
| Darya Garuzina
|
|
|}

Scoring chart
Red numbers indicate the couples with the lowest score for each week.
Green numbers indicate the couples with the highest score for each week.
 indicates the couples eliminated that week.
 indicates the returning couple that finished in the bottom two.
 indicates the returning couple was the last to be called safe (they may or may have not been in the bottom two).
 indicates the winning couple.
 indicates the runner-up couple.
 indicates the third-place couple.
 This couple was immune.

 Weeks 1. The dance partner of Ronny Munizaga, Roberta Davagnino, got hurt while they were testing 3 hours before the program, in her replacement there came Anastasia Soquina, who had to learn the choreography in less than 3 hours.  Daniela Castillo was immune (badword).
 Weeks 2. The journalist Fernanda Hunsen, was hurt during the rehearsals, causing cuts in her head, the imagen of her fall was shocking on having seen the blood in the track of ice, nevertheless she present equally they achieve only a of 10 points.
 Weeks 3. In the episode 3, Carla Ballero appeared to skating, ignoring the medical orders, the one who recommended to her to skate for an injury in her tendon. She skated a medicine being injected for the pain.

Songs

Week 1

Running order

Week 2

Running order

Week 3

Running order

Week 4

Running order

Week 5

Running order

Week 6

Running order

Call-Out Order

 This couple came in first place with the judges
 This couple came in first place with the judges and had the encore for the week
 This couple came in last place with the judges
 This couple came in last place with the judges and was eliminated
 This couple was eliminated
 This couple was eliminated and had the encore for the week
 This couple was eliminated, had the encore for the week, and came in last with the judges
 This couple won the competition
 This couple came second overall in the competition
 This couple had the inmunation for the week

Musical Guests & Performance Dancers

External links
Official website of Chile Estrellas en el Hielo

2008 Chilean television seasons